Horní Kamenice is a municipality and village in Plzeň-South District in the Plzeň Region of the Czech Republic. It has about 300 inhabitants.

Geography
It lies on the border of the Švihov Uplands and Plasy Uplands. Horní Kamenice is located in the valley of the river Radbuza. The Srbický Creek flows through the municipality.

History
The first written mention of Horní Kamenice is from 1115.

From 1 January 2021, Horní Kamenice is no longer a part of Domažlice District and belongs to Plzeň-South District.

Gallery

References

External links

Villages in Plzeň-South District